Mount Taranaki (also known as Mount Egmont) is a dormant stratovolcano in the Taranaki region on the west coast of New Zealand's North Island. At , it is the second highest mountain in the North Island, after Mount Ruapehu. It has a secondary cone, Fanthams Peak, on its south side.

Name
The name Taranaki is from the Māori language. It comes from Ruataranaki, ancestor of the local Taranaki iwi. The Māori word tara means mountain peak, and naki may come from ngaki, meaning "clear of vegetation."

Captain Cook named it Mount Egmont on 11 January 1770 after John Perceval, 2nd Earl of Egmont, a former First Lord of the Admiralty who had supported the concept of an oceanic search for Terra Australis Incognita. Cook described it as "of a prodigious height and its top cover'd with everlasting snow," surrounded by a "flat country ... which afforded a very good aspect, being clothed with wood and verdure".

When the French explorer Marc-Joseph Marion du Fresne saw the mountain on 25 March 1772 he named it Pic Mascarin. He was unaware of Cook's earlier visit.

It appeared as Mount Egmont on maps until 29 May 1986, when the name officially became "Mount Taranaki or Mount Egmont" following a decision by the Minister of Lands. The Egmont name still applies to the national park that surrounds the peak and geologists still refer to the peak as the Egmont Volcano.

As part of the treaty settlement with Ngā Iwi o Taranaki the mountain will be officially named Taranaki Maunga. As of 18 July 2021, the settlement has not yet been completed.

Geology
It is situated in the sedmentary Taranaki Basin and is part of the Taranaki Volcanic Lineament which has had a 30 mm/yr north to south migration over the last 1.75 million years.

Volcanic activity
Taranaki is geologically young, having commenced activity approximately 135,000 years ago. The most recent volcanic activity was the production of a lava dome in the crater and its collapse down the side of the mountain in the 1850s or 1860s. Between 1755 and 1800, an eruption sent a pyroclastic flow down the mountain's northeast flanks, and a moderate ash eruption occurred about 1755, of the size of Ruapehu's activity in 1995/1996. The last major eruption occurred around 1655. Recent research has shown that over the last 9,000 years minor eruptions have occurred roughly every 90 years on average, with major eruptions every 500 years.

Hazards
 
Taranaki is unusual in that it has experienced at least five of its major eruptions by the method of cone collapse. Few volcanoes have undergone more than one cone collapse. The vast volume of material involved in these collapses is reflected in the extensive ring plain surrounding the volcano. There is also evidence of lahars being a common result of eruption. The major collapse cycles have a potential maximum size of collapse of  every 30,000 to 35,000 years. Another major collapse is expected to occur with 16,200 years.

Much of the region is at risk from lahars, which have reached as far as the coast. A volcanic event is not necessary for a lahar: even earthquakes combined with heavy rain or snow could dislodge vast quantities of unstable layers resting on steep slopes. Many farmers live in the paths of such possible destructive events.

Although volcanic eruptions are notoriously chaotic in their frequency, some scientists warn that a large eruption is "overdue". Research from Massey University indicates that significant seismic activity from the local faults is likely again in the next 50 years and such might be permissive to an eruption. What ever in the next 50 years, the probability of at least one eruption is between 33% and 42%. Prevailing winds would probably blow ash east, covering much of the North Island, and disrupting air routes, power transmission lines and local water supplies.

Older volcanoes in the area

Mount Taranaki is one of four closely associated Quaternary volcanoes in Taranaki province that have erupted from andesite magmas that have not extensively assimilated enriched crust unlike the cone volcanos of the North Island Volcanic Plateau. It sits on the remains of three older volcanic complexes that lie to the northwest. The Indo-Australian Plate is slowly moving relative to the magma source that feeds these volcanoes. This trend is reflected in Fanthams Peak, the newer secondary cone on the southeast side of Taranaki and named after Fanny Fantham who was the first European woman to climb the peak in 1887.

The oldest volcanic remnants consist of a series of lava plugs: Paritutu Rock (156 metres), which forms part of New Plymouth's harbour, and the Sugar Loaf Islands close offshore. These have been dated at 1.75 million years.

On the coast, 15 kilometres southwest of New Plymouth is the Kaitake Range (682 metres), last active approximately 500,000 years ago.

Nearest to Taranaki is the Pouakai Range. Pouakai may have originated around the same time as Kaitake but remained active until about 240,000 years ago. Much of Pouakai's large ring plain was obliterated by the Egmont Volcano, the hills near Eltham being the only remnant to the south.

Māori mythology

According to Māori mythology, Taranaki once resided in the middle of the North Island, with all the other New Zealand volcanoes. The beautiful Pihanga was coveted by all the mountains, and a great battle broke out between them. Tongariro eventually won the day, inflicted great wounds on the side of Taranaki, and causing him to flee. Taranaki headed westwards, following Te Toka a Rahotu (the Rock of Rahotu) and forming the deep gorges of the Whanganui River, paused for a while, creating the depression that formed the Te Ngaere swamp, then heading north. Further progress was blocked by the Pouakai Ranges, and as the sun came up Taranaki became petrified in his current location. When Taranaki conceals himself with rainclouds, he is said to be crying for his lost love, and during spectacular sunsets, he is said to be displaying himself to her. In turn, Tongariro's eruptions are said to be a warning to Taranaki not to return.

History

In 1865 the mountain was confiscated from Māori by the New Zealand Government under the powers of the New Zealand Settlements Act 1863, ostensibly as a means of establishing and maintaining peace amid the Second Taranaki War. The legislation was framed with the intention of seizing and dividing up the land of Māori "in rebellion" and providing it as farmland for military settlers. In 1839 the mountain had been climbed by the Swiss trained doctor and naturalist Ernst Dieffenbach. During his initial ascent, he identified the fast-flowing streams as being well suited to water driven mills. Dieffenbach was employed by the New Zealand Company to advise on the potential of land he explored in the North Island in 1839–40.

The mountain was returned to the people of Taranaki in 1978 by means of the Mount Egmont Vesting Act 1978, which vested it to the Taranaki Maori Trust Board. By means of the same Act, it was immediately passed back to the Government as a gift to the nation. The Waitangi Tribunal, in its 1996 report, Kaupapa Tuatahi, observed: "We are unaware of the evidence that the hapū agreed to this arrangement. Many who made submissions to us were adamant that most knew nothing of it." It cited a submission that suggested the political climate of 1975 was such that the board felt it was necessary to perform a gesture of goodwill designed to create a more favourable environment within which a monetary settlement could be negotiated.

Because of its resemblance to Mount Fuji, Taranaki provided the backdrop for the 2003 film The Last Samurai.

In 2017, a record of understanding was signed between Taranaki iwi and the New Zealand government that will see the mountain become a legal personality. It is the third geographic feature in the country to be granted a legal personality, after Te Urewera and Whanganui River.

On 2 December 2019, an agreement between the crown and Ngā Iwi o Taranaki was announced that the mountain was to only be referred to as Taranaki Maunga. The national park will be renamed from Egmont National Park to Te Papakura o Taranaki. The name change has not yet been ratified by the New Zealand Geographic Board.

National park

In 1881, a circular area with a radius of six miles (9.6 km) from the summit was protected as a forest reserve. Areas encompassing the older volcanic remnants of Pouakai and Kaitake were later added to the reserve and in 1900 all this land was gazetted as Egmont National Park, the second national park in New Zealand. There are parts of the national park where old-growth forests are found. With intensively-farmed dairy pasture right up to the park boundary, the change in vegetation is sharply delineated as a circular shape in satellite images.

Recreation

The Stratford Mountain Club operates the Manganui skifield on the eastern slope. Equipment access to the skifield is by flying fox across the Manganui Gorge.

The Taranaki Alpine Club maintains Tahurangi Lodge on the north slope of the mountain, next to the television tower. The lodge is frequently used as the base for public climbs to the summit held in the summer months. The various climbing and tramping clubs organize these public events and provide informal guides.

Syme Hut is located near Fanthams Peak. It is maintained by the Department of Conservation and is available to trampers on a first come first served basis.

For the average person, Taranaki would be considered a moderate mountain to climb. It takes a person with good fitness level a day to make the up-and-back climb. Weather on the mountain can change rapidly, which has caught inexperienced trampers and climbers unawares. As of 27 June 2017, 84 people have died on the mountain since records began in 1891, many having been caught by a sudden change in the weather. In terms of fatalities this mountain is the second most dangerous mountain in New Zealand after Aoraki / Mount Cook.

Gallery

Access

There are three roads leading part-way up the mountain. The highest is to East Egmont plateau, with a viewing platform and parking facilities for the skifield. It lies at the transition between subalpine scrub and alpine herbfields.

There are park visitor centres at North Egmont and at Dawson Falls on the southeast side.

The eastern side from Stratford leads to the Stratford Mountain House, and the ski field.

There is no road access on the western side. However, a road winds for 10 km through native bush over the saddle between Pouakai and Kaitake. Near the top of this road is the renowned Pukeiti Trust rhododendron garden.

Transmitter 
The Mount Egmont transmitter is the main television and FM radio transmitter for the Taranaki region. It is located on the north-eastern slope of the mountain adjacent to Tahurangi Lodge. The first transmitter at the site was commissioned by the New Zealand Broadcasting Corporation (NZBC) in 1966 to relay Wellington's WNTV1 channel (now part of TVNZ 1).

See also
 List of mountains of New Zealand by height
 List of volcanoes in New Zealand
 National parks of New Zealand
 Volcanism of New Zealand

References

External links 

  
 New Zealand Mountain Safety Council's video on the Mount Taranaki Summit Route
 Climbing Taranaki - from peakbagging.org.nz
 Mt Egmont photos 
 Taranaki Volcano Cam
 Volcanic Taranaki - Puke Ariki

Mountains of Taranaki
Volcanoes of Taranaki
Mount Taranaki
Active volcanoes
Pleistocene stratovolcanoes
Mount Taranaki
Environmental personhood
Holocene stratovolcanoes